Zenith is an unincorporated community in Stafford County, Kansas, United States.  It is located east of Stafford, next to a railroad and U.S. Route 50 highway at NE 140th Ave.

History
A post office was opened in Zenith in 1902, and remained in operation until it was discontinued in 1974.

References

Further reading

External links
 Stafford County maps: Current, Historic, KDOT

Unincorporated communities in Stafford County, Kansas
Unincorporated communities in Kansas